30th Battalion may refer to:

 30th Battalion (Australia), a unit of the Australian Army raised for service during World War I
 2/30th Battalion (Australia), a unit of the Australian Army raised for service during World War II
 30th Battalion, CEF, a unit of the Canadian Expeditionary Force raised for service during World War I
 30th Battalion, Bengal Native Infantry, an infantry unit of the British Indian Army 
 30th Battalion (New Zealand), a World War II infantry battalion

See also
 30th Division (disambiguation)
 30 Squadron (disambiguation)